Sumas is a city in Washington.

Sumas may also refer to:

Communities
Sumas First Nation, a Native American tribe of the Pacific Northwest, part of the Sto:lo people
The Suma-Jumano, a Native American tribe of the American Southwest
Sumas, British Columbia, a former municipality in British Columbia, now amalgamated with the City of Abbotsford
District of Sumas, a former district of the Lower Mainland, British Columbia, that became the district of Sumas Prairie in the City of Abbotsford

Geography
Sumas Mountain, a mountain in Whatcom County, Washington
Sumas Mountain (British Columbia), a mountain in British Columbia, Canada
Sumas Peak, the summit of that mountain
Sumas Mountain Provincial Park, a provincial park in British Columbia
Sumas Lake, a former lake in British Columbia
Sumas Prairie, an agricultural region and rural neighbourhood in Abbotsford, British Columbia
Sumas Lake Canal, a manmade channel on the northwest flank of Sumas Prairie carrying the drainage-volume of the former lake, see Sumas Lake
Sumas River, in the Fraser Lowland, between the US and Canada

Other
Sumas Border Crossing, a major Canada-US border crossing, see Huntingdon, Abbotsford
Chilliwack-Sumas, BC, Canada; a provincial electoral district
Sustainability Management School (SUMAS)

See also

 
 Suma (disambiguation)